Web Services Composite Application Framework (WS-CAF) is an open framework developed by OASIS. Its purpose is to define a generic and open framework for applications that contain multiple services used together, which are sometimes referred to as composite applications. WS-CAF characteristics include interoperability, ease of implementation and ease of use.

Scope 

The scope of WS-CAF includes:

 Provision of WSDL definitions for context, coordination and transactions.
 Message formats will be specified as SOAP headers and/or body content.
 The specification is to be programming language-neutral and platform-neutral.
 Demonstrated composability with other Web Service specifications that are being developed as open, recognized standards
 The goals of promoting convergence, consistent use, and a coherent architecture.
 Support composability as a critical architectural characteristic of Web service specifications. WS-CAF and WS-Context are targeted to become building blocks for other Web service specifications and standards.

Input specifications 

The WS-CAF accepts the following Web services specifications as input:

 WS-Context
 WS-Coordination Framework (WS-CF)
 WS-Transaction Management (WS-TXM)

Benefits 

The benefits and results of CAF are intended to be standard and interoperable ways to:

 Demarcate and coordinate web service activities
 Propagate and coordinate context information
 Notify participants of changes in an activity
 Define the relationship of coordinators to each other
 Recover transactions predictably and consistently in a business process execution.
 Interact across multiple transaction models (such as are used in CORBA, CICS, Enterprise JavaBeans or .NET environments).

See also
 WS-Coordination - an alternative transaction standard
 Enterprise service bus

External links
 NetBeans SOA Composite Application Project Home
 camelse
 Running Apache Camel in OpenESB

References 

Web service specifications
Web services
Enterprise application integration